Hypoflavia is a genus of lichenized fungi in the family Caliciaceae. The genus in found in South America, especially in tropical regions, and contains two species.

References

Caliciales
Lichen genera
Caliciales genera
Taxa described in 2000